Brännström is a Swedish surname that may refer to:

Anders Brännström (born 1957), Swedish Army major general
Brasse Brännström (real name Lars Erik Brännström; 1945–2014), Swedish actor
Erik Brännström, Swedish ice hockey defenceman
Gösta Brännström (1926–1997), Swedish sprinter
Katarina Brännström (born 1950), Swedish politician
Mauritz Brännström (1918–2006), Swedish cross-country skier
Moni Nilsson-Brännström (born 1955), Swedish author

Swedish-language surnames